The 2009 Chevy Rock & Roll 400 was the 26th race in the 2009 NASCAR Sprint Cup season, and served as the last race in the "regular season" before the 2009 Chase for the Sprint Cup. The 400-lap,  race was held on Saturday night, September 12, 2009 at the  Richmond International Raceway in Henrico County, Virginia outside the state capital city, and was telecast on ABC with radio being handled by MRN Radio (over the air/terrestrial) and Sirius XM Radio (satellite). After this race, the top twelve drivers in the points standings were determined to enter the ten-race playoff to decide the 2009 Sprint Cup Champion, and their points were reset to 5,000 points with a ten-point bonus for each win they compile during the first 26 events this year. Denny Hamlin won the race, Brian Vickers gets the last spot, leaving Kyle Busch who won four times out, along with Matt Kenseth. It is the first time he has failed to make the cut.

Race
The race was mainly a duel between Jeff Gordon and Denny Hamlin. The duo led 396 of the 400 laps run. Gordon got shoved to sixth, but made it up to third late in the race. Hamlin then held off Kurt Busch to win.

Race results

Chase Points Standings Starting at New Hampshire
1. 5-Mark Martin 5040 Points (4th Appearance)
2. 14-Tony Stewart 5030 Points (5th Appearance)
3. 48-Jimmie Johnson 5030 Points (6th Appearance)
4. 11-Denny Hamlin 5020 Points (4th Appearance)
5. 9-Kasey Kahne 5020 Points (2nd Appearance)
6. 24-Jeff Gordon 5010 Points (5th Appearance)
7. 2-Kurt Busch 5010 Points (4th Appearance)
8. 83-Brian Vickers 5010 Points (1st Appearance)
9. 99-Carl Edwards 5000 Points (4th Appearance)
10. 39-Ryan Newman 5000 Points (3rd Appearance)
11. 42-Juan Pablo Montoya 5000 Points (1st Appearance)
12. 16-Greg Biffle 5000 Points (3rd Appearance)

References

Chevy Rock and Roll 400
Chevy Rock and Roll 400
NASCAR races at Richmond Raceway
September 2009 sports events in the United States